Reuben Cooper (born 14 August 1951) is a former Australian rules footballer. He is notable for playing for the South Melbourne in the Victorian Football League (VFL - now AFL).

Biography
Cooper was born into a footballing family. His grandfather, also named Reuben Cooper, was the first "coloured" player to play in the Darwin league. His father Ron and several other relatives played top level football in Darwin.

Playing career
In 1968 Cooper moved to Melbourne to play for South Melbourne but was unable to play for the Swans immediately due to Northern Territory transfer rules. He spent the 1968 season playing suburban football in Melbourne.

He made his league debut during the 1969 VFL season as a seventeen-year-old, becoming the first player from the Northern Territory to play in the VFL.

After returning to Darwin, he played for Darwin Football Club in the Northern Territory Football League (NTFL). He was best on ground in the Buffaloes' 1970/71 grand final-winning team.

Coaching career
Cooper was coach of NTFL club Nightcliff for the 1986/87 season.

External links

References

1951 births
Sydney Swans players
Darwin Football Club players
Australian rules footballers from the Northern Territory
Indigenous Australian players of Australian rules football
Living people